Ferhat Pasha may refer to:

Serdar Ferhad Pasha (or Ferhat Pasha), Ottoman, twice grand vizier
Treaty of Constantinople (1590), or Treaty of Ferhad Pasha
Ferhad Pasha Sokolović, Ottoman general and statesman
Ferhat Pasha Mosque (Banja Luka), in Banja Luka, Bosnia and Herzegovina